Highgrove is a rural locality in the Toowoomba Region, Queensland, Australia. In the  Highgrove had a population of 29 people.

Geography 
The ridgeline of the Great Dividing Range roughly bounds the locality to the north and east.

The Oakey–Cooyar Road traverses the locality entering from the south-east (Evergreen) and exiting to the north (Nutgrove).

The predominant land use is grazing on native vegetation with some crop growing in the south of the locality.

History 
In the  Highgrove had a population of 29 people.

Heritage listings 
Highgrove has a number of heritage-listed sites, including:
 Narko-Nutgrove Road from Highgrove to Nutgrove: Muntapa Tunnel

Economy 
There are a number of homesteads in the locality:

 Bulgana
 Burndale
 Datarra Hills
 Glazels
 Rocky Basin
 Springview

References 

Toowoomba Region
Localities in Queensland